YRF may refer to:

 Yash Raj Films, a movie production company.
 Cartwright Airport, IATA airport code
 YRF - Youth Renewal Fund